Mansa Mahmud III, also known as Mamadou II, was mansa ("king of kings") of the Mali Empire from 1496 to 1559. He was the last mansa to rule from Niani and is known as the mansa under which Mali suffered the most losses to its territory.

Further Songhay Expansion
Songhai forces under the command of Askia Muhammad I defeat the Mali general Fati Quali in 1502 and seize the province of Diafunu. In 1514, the Denanke dynasty is established in Tekrour.  It isn't long before the new kingdom of Great Fulo is warring against Mali's remaining provinces.  To add insult to injury, the Songhai Empire seizes the copper mines of Takedda.

More Talks with Portugal
In 1534, Mahmud III received another Portuguese envoy to the Mali court by the name of Peros Fernandes.  This envoy from the Portuguese coastal port of Elmina arrives in response to the growing trade along the coast and Mali's now urgent request for military assistance against Songhai.  Still, no help is forthcoming and Mali must watch its possessions fall one by one.

Rise of the Kaabu Empire
Mansa Mahmud III's reign also sees the military outpost and province of Kaabu become independent in 1537.  The Kaabu Empire appears every bit as ambitions as Mali was in its early years and swallows up Mali's remaining Gambian provinces of Cassa and Bati.

Sack of Niani
The most defining moment in Mahmud III's reign is the final conflict between Mali and Songhai in 1545.  Songhai forces under Askia Ishaq’s brother, Daoud, sack Niani and occupy the palace.  Mansa Mahmud III is forced to flee Niani for the mountains.  Within a week, he regroups with his forces and launches a successful counter-attack forcing the Songhai out of Manden proper for good.  The Songhai Empire does keep Mali's ambitions in check, but never fully conquers their old masters.

From Niani to Kangaba
After liberating the capital, Mahmud III abandons it for a new residence further north.  Still, there is no end to Mali's troubles.  In 1559, the kingdom of Fouta Tooro succeeds in taking Takrur.  This defeat reduces Mali to Manden proper with control extending only as far as Kita in the west, Kangaba in the north, the Niger River bend in the east and Kouroussa in the south.

References

See also
Mali Empire
Keita Dynasty

Mansas of Mali
People of the Mali Empire
15th-century monarchs in Africa
16th-century monarchs in Africa
Keita family